Frederick Leforest Van Sickle (January 31, 1943 – September 2, 2021) was a United States district judge of the United States District Court for the Eastern District of Washington.

Education and career

Born in Superior, Wisconsin, Van Sickle received a Bachelor of Science degree from the University of Wisconsin in 1965 and a Juris Doctor from the University of Washington School of Law in 1968. Van Sickle was a First Lieutenant in the United States Army, JAG Corps, from 1968 to 1970. He was a prosecuting attorney of Douglas County, Washington from 1971 to 1975, also working in private practice during that time.

Judicial service

State judicial service 
Van Sickle was a judge on the Superior Court for Grant and Douglas Counties from 1975 to 1979, and for Chelan and Douglas Counties from 1979 to 1992.

Federal judicial service 
On March 21, 1991, Van Sickle was nominated by President George H. W. Bush to a new seat on the United States District Court for the Eastern District of Washington created by 104 Stat. 5089. He was confirmed by the United States Senate on May 9, 1991, and received his commission on May 14, 1991. He served as Chief Judge from 2000 to 2005, and assumed senior status on May 1, 2008. He died on September 2, 2021, aged 78.

References

Sources

1943 births
2021 deaths
Judges of the United States District Court for the Eastern District of Washington
United States district court judges appointed by George H. W. Bush
20th-century American judges
Washington (state) state court judges
United States Army officers
University of Washington School of Law alumni
Superior court judges in the United States
21st-century American judges
People from Superior, Wisconsin